Dmitry Mikhaylenko may refer to:

 Dmitry Mikhaylenko (footballer, born 1995), Russian football player
 Dmitry Mikhaylenko (footballer, born 2000), Russian football player
 Dmytro Mykhaylenko (born 1973), Ukrainian football player